Essays in the Philosophy of Humanism is a peer-reviewed academic journal and the official journal of the American Humanist Association. It is published twice annually and edited by Marian Hillar. It covers the philosophy of humanism.

Origins 
In 1992 "Humanists of Houston", a chapter of the American Humanist Association, decided at the initiative of Marian Hillar and Robert Finch to publish lectures and seminars that were presented by notable speakers at the meetings of the group, doing so under the general title Essays in the Philosophy of Humanism. With time the scope of the publication was enlarged to include solicited and unsolicited papers from others. In 2005, the American Humanist Association adopted Essays in the Philosophy of Humanism as its official journal.

References

External links 
 

Social philosophy journals
English-language journals
Biannual journals
Humanism
Publications established in 1992
Equinox Publishing (Sheffield) academic journals
American Humanist Association